Gavin Wilkinson (born 5 November 1973) is a former New Zealand footballer who served as general manager and President of Soccer for the Portland Timbers from 2009 to 2022.

Prior to this position, Wilkinson was manager of Portland Timbers in the United Soccer League before their promotion to Major League Soccer beginning with the 2011 season. As a player, he was known as a strong leader and defender.

Playing career

Club career 
Wilkinson played defence for with the USL Portland Timbers from 2001 to 2006, adding assistant coach duties in 2005 and 2006.  Wilkinson retired as an active player and was named Head Coach and General Manager for Portland Timbers in September 2006. During the 2009 season, he directed the Timbers to the Commissioner's Cup as the regular season champion and a league record 24 game unbeaten string (14-0-10), smashing the previous record of 16.

International career 
Wilkinson played for the New Zealand national football team, the All Whites and collected 33 caps in official FIFA internationals, scoring 1 goal.

Coaching career
Wilkinson also runs EastSide Timbers FC, a youth soccer club based in Gresham, OR.

On 18 January 2010, Wilkinson was named Technical Director of the expansion Portland Timbers club in Major League Soccer (MLS), set to begin play in the 2011 season. He assumed those duties while still coaching the Timbers through the 2010 season.

Portland Thorns 
Wilkinson was the general manager of the Portland Thorns, the Timbers' sister club in the National Women's Soccer League from its inception in 2013. As a result of the 2021 fallout of the scandal surrounding allegations that Paul Riley had sexually harassed Thorns players during his tenure as the club's coach (2014 to 2015), Wilkinson, who was responsible for Riley's hire and the eventual non-retainment of Riley's services following the 2015 season, was put on administrative leave from the Thorns and eventually replaced by Karina Leblanc. An independent investigation into abuse in the NWSL commissioned by the US Soccer Federation and lead by Sally Yates detailed how Wilkinson encouraged other clubs to hire Riley after his departure from the Thorns. According to the report, Wilkinson "told the Flash that Riley was 'put in a bad position by the player,' and that Wilkinson would 'hire [Riley] in a heartbeat.'" Wilkinson also acted to hide the abuse from the media by telling reporters that Riley was let go because the team failed to make the playoffs. Medical staff of the club also reported that Wilkinson was made aware that Riley had interfered with their treatment and was endangering players.

Wilkinson and the Portland Timbers front office faced further accusations of misconduct in the face of abuse reports in February 2022, when Major League Soccer suspended Timbers player Andy Polo pending an investigation into allegations of domestic violence made by Polo's ex-partner. Police reports later indicated that Timbers employees were present when police arrived to investigate the initial call in May 2021, months before The Athletic's report on Paul Riley was published, but the team failed to report the incident to the league for nine months. Polo's ex-partner detailed the event on Peruvian television, and claimed she had been pressured into not filing charges against Polo. An MLS investigation in March 2022 claimed the Timbers did not pressure Polo's ex-partner nor intentionally conceal the incident or their involvement. Wilkinson claimed Diego Valeri opposed the decision to cut Polo, which Valeri denied as he was no longer with the Timbers at the time of Polo's release from the team.

After an October 2022 report commissioned by the U.S. Soccer Federation was revealed, Timbers and Thorns owner Merritt Paulson announced Wilkinson, team president Mike Golub, and Paulson himself would thereafter recuse themselves from all Thorns decisions. Their respective futures with regard to the Timbers were not included in the statement. Earlier that day, the Timbers Army and Rose City Riveters formally demanded the removal of Wilkinson and Golub and for Paulson to sell the teams.

On 5 October, Wilkinson and Golub were fired from the club. A report in The Athletic stated that Wilkinson was set to receive a contract extension, with a clause which allowed the club to terminate for cause.

Honours

Player
Perth Glory
Most Glorious Player Award (1x): 1996-1997

Manager
Portland Timbers
Cascadia Cup (1x): 2012

USL-1 Coach of the Year (2x): 2007, 2009

Managerial stats

References

External links

1973 births
Living people
Association football defenders
Association footballers from Auckland
Double Flower FA players
Major League Soccer executives
New Zealand association football coaches
New Zealand association footballers
New Zealand international footballers
Perth Glory FC players
Portland Timbers (2001–2010) players
Portland Timbers (MLS) coaches
Portland Timbers (USL) coaches
A-League (1995–2004) players
USL First Division players
USL First Division coaches
Waitakere City FC players
1998 OFC Nations Cup players
1999 FIFA Confederations Cup players
2000 OFC Nations Cup players
2003 FIFA Confederations Cup players
Hong Kong First Division League players
League of Ireland players
New Zealand expatriate association footballers
Expatriate association footballers in the Republic of Ireland
Expatriate footballers in Hong Kong
Expatriate footballers in Singapore
Expatriate soccer players in Australia
Expatriate soccer players in the United States
New Zealand expatriate sportspeople in Ireland
New Zealand expatriate sportspeople in Hong Kong
New Zealand expatriate sportspeople in Singapore
New Zealand expatriate sportspeople in Australia
New Zealand expatriate sportspeople in the United States